Mustafin is a Bashkir, Tatar and Uzbek masculine surname, which is common in the countries of the former Soviet Union; its feminine counterpart is Mustafina. It may refer to:
Aliya Mustafina (born 1994), Russian artistic gymnast
Farhat Mustafin (born 1950), Russian wrestler
Gabiden Mustafin (1902–1984), Kazakh author and politician
Isaac Mustafin (1908–1968), Russian chemist
Mikhail Mustafin (born 1983), Russian football player
Oleksiy Mustafin (born 1971), Ukrainian media manager, journalist, and politician
Rifat Mustafin (born 1983), Russian football player
Rustam Mustafin (born 1977), Russian football player
Temur Mustafin (born 1995), Russian football player

Bashkir-language surnames
Tatar-language surnames
Uzbek-language surnames

ru:Мустафин